Laterza may refer to

 Laterza, Apulia, town and comune in the province of Taranto, part of the Apulia region of southeast Italy
 , Italian publishing house
 Laterza (surname), Italian surname
 Laterza culture, Eneolithic culture in Southern Italy
 Scrittori d'Italia Laterza, an Italian book collection